Robert Everaert (30 March 1923 – 19 September 1951) was a Belgian former long-distance runner who competed in the 1948 Summer Olympics.

References

External links
 

1923 births
1951 deaths
Belgian male long-distance runners
Olympic athletes of Belgium
Athletes (track and field) at the 1948 Summer Olympics
Belgian male steeplechase runners